Beyazıt Square lies to the north of Ordu Caddesi in the district of Fatih, Istanbul, Turkey. Officially named Freedom Square, it is more generally known as Beyazıt Square after the early Ottoman Bayezid II Mosque on one side. The square is the former site of the Forum of Theodosius (AKA Forum Tauri) built by Constantine the Great. Its current form was designed by Turgut Cansever.

Facing the mosque across the square is a medrese that formed part of its complex. In the past this served as a Museum of Calligraphy. After long years of closure, this was under restoration in 2022.

On one side of the square is the main entrance to Istanbul University, its buildings designed by the French architect Marie-Auguste Antoine Bourgeois. It is accessible via a grand Neo-Renaissance arch. The Beyazıt Tower, once a fire-warning tower, in the grounds of the university is visible from the square. 

Between the entrance to the university and the mosque is the Beyazit State Library, founded in 1884 and completely renovated and modernised in 2006 by the Tabanlıoğlu firm of architects. During the course of the renovation the remains of a Byzantine church were found below the site. Before its conversion into a library the building had been used as a soup kitchen and caravanserai. 

The square has been the site of political protests, including some in 1969 known as Bloody Sunday, and a terrorist attack in 1978 (Beyazıt Massacre). In 1915 twenty Armenian activists were hanged in the square (The 20 Hunchakian gallows).

Beyazit Square is accessible via the T1 tram line as is the adjacent Covered Bazaar (Kapalı Çarşı).

In 2022 Beyazit Square was being entirely reorganised.

Notes and references

External links

Squares in Istanbul
Fatih